José Poy (11 April 1926 – 8 February 1996) was an Argentine football player and coach who spent the majority of his career with São Paulo in Brazil, making a total of 565 appearances. After retiring as a player, Poy spent a number of spells as manager of São Paulo.

References

External links
José Poy at BDFA.com.ar 

1926 births
1996 deaths
Argentine footballers
Argentine expatriate footballers
Argentine football managers
Rosario Central footballers
Club Atlético Banfield footballers
São Paulo FC players
Expatriate footballers in Brazil
Argentine expatriate sportspeople in Brazil
Expatriate football managers in Brazil
São Paulo FC managers
Santa Cruz Futebol Clube managers
Associação Atlética Internacional (Limeira) managers
Esporte Clube XV de Novembro (Jaú) managers
Associação Portuguesa de Desportos managers
Association football goalkeepers
Footballers from Rosario, Santa Fe